Central Jersey Regional Airport  is a privately owned, public use airport in Somerset County, New Jersey, United States. The airport is one nautical mile (2 km) south of the central business district of Manville. It is located in Hillsborough Township and was formerly known as Kupper Airport. This facility is included in the National Plan of Integrated Airport Systems for 2011–2015, which categorized it as a general aviation reliever airport.

On the airport property is the Van Nest – Weston Burying Ground, a small cemetery.

The airport was originally owned by Charles Kupper who was a real estate investor and managed by Manville Aviation.  One of the notable features of the airport there were stiff crosswinds from the north west at times making landing challenging.  The airport originally sold 80LL and 100LL aviation fuel.  During the early late 1960s into the early 1970s a short 2,000 foot unimproved or grass runway was constructed running perpendicular to the paved runway starting approximately 100' NE of the beginning of runway 7 extending south east.

Facilities and aircraft 
Central Jersey Regional Airport covers an area of 119 acres (48 ha) at an elevation of 86 feet (26 m) above mean sea level. It has one runway designated 7/25 with an asphalt surface measuring 3,510 by 50 feet (1,070 x 15 m).

For the 12-month period ending May 1, 2008, the airport had 24,300 general aviation aircraft operations, an average of 66 per day. At that time there were 107 aircraft based at this airport: 85% single-engine, 6% ultralight, 6% multi-engine, 2% glider, and 1% helicopter.

On field 
 Fuel: 100LL
 Parking
 Aircraft service
 Aircraft rental
 Pilot lounge and supplies
 Raritan Valley Composite Squadron (NJ-003) of the Civil Air Patrol
 Pizza & Pasta Restaurant

See also 
 List of airports in New Jersey

References 

 Flight Guide published by Airguide Publications, Inc. – published semiannually

External links 
 Central Jersey Regional Airport (47N) at New Jersey DOT Airport Directory
 Central Jersey Airport Services, the fixed-base operator (FBO)
 Aerial image as of April 1995 from USGS The National Map
 

Airports in New Jersey
Transportation buildings and structures in Somerset County, New Jersey